Kate Kohler (born February 16, 1969) is an American pianist, singer, composer, and educator, best known for her CD series of piano compositions called Lullabies for Grownups.

Music career
Her first solo album was Elusive Victory, released in 2002. She released a follow up, called Dangerously Beige, in 2007.

Lullabies for Grownups
After living in Bozeman, Montana for some years, Kohler gained some press with the release of the first album of her Lullabies for Grownups series in 2008, entitled Clouds. The CD, along with its two sequels, Stars and Moon, proved to be very successful among yoga instructors and massage therapists. The three albums are designed to be peaceful and relaxing, and was referred to as "musical meditation" by John Hoskings, artistic director of the Vigilante Theater Company in Bozeman.

Current work
Kohler is based in Los Angeles. She released an album closer to the style of her pre-Lullabies work, entitled Unexpected Romance, in 2011. The album was produced by her brother Rob Kohler, and features 11 original compositions for piano and voice.

Kohler Music Media
Kohler also runs a small publishing company in Los Angeles, called Kohler Music Press. Their main product is the Perfect Staff Paper Notebook, a small booklet of blank staff paper that is marketed towards students and educators alike. They have also published a theory book written by Rob Kohler, and several score books made up of compositions by other members of the Kohler family. The company also produced and distributed This World's 2013 album, Celestial Skies.

Discography
Elusive Victory (2002)
Dangerously Beige (2007)
Unexpected Romance (2011)

Lullabies for Grownups
Clouds (2008)
Stars (2008)
Moon (2009)

With This World
This World (1996), guest vocals
Celestial Skies (2013)

References

External links
 Official Website
 Lullabies for Grownups Official Website

1969 births
Living people
People from Great Falls, Montana
Musicians from Montana
People from Bozeman, Montana
Musicians from Los Angeles
20th-century American pianists
20th-century American women pianists
21st-century American pianists
21st-century American women pianists